Hilton Beach is a village located in Algoma District, Ontario, Canada. It is located on the northeastern shore of St. Joseph Island in the North Channel of Lake Huron, approximately 60 kilometres from Sault Ste. Marie. The village had a population of 175 (up from 145 in 2011) and a land area of 2.62 km² per the Canada 2016 Census.

History 

The area which is now known as Hilton Beach had its origins in the 1850s when a wharf was first built. By the 1860s, fourteen families had settled in the area, including the Trainors, Rousseaus, Gordons, Bishops and Desjardins.

John Marks came to St. Joseph Island in the 1860s to settle at Sailors Encampment.  He moved to the area that would become Hilton Beach in 1872. Marks first opened a store and a wood dock followed by a post office six years later under the name of Marksville. A school was established in 1877, and in 1881 St. John's Anglican Church was erected.

J. Archibald built a hotel in 1879, originally called The Ottawa House. It was moved to its current site in 1890. Other businesses included Bowker's General Store, Duncan's General Store, R. Chester's shoemaker shop, and the sawmill operated by Dean and Davis. J.C. Cooper was a wagon maker, and T. Steinburg was the blacksmith, who operated out of the white concrete building still standing today on Hilton Road.

A.G. Duncan, D. McPhail and John Marks were justices. The village was called Marksville until June 1, 1921, when it was changed to Hilton Beach. Two years later the village separated from Hilton Township and became St. Joseph Island's first village.

Many of the historical buildings in Hilton Beach are still being used today. The community hall, renovated in 1989, was originally built in 1896 and used as a schoolhouse until the 1960s. The old town hall, built in 1916, was used as a violin workshop for several years and is now for sale. The Hilton Beach General Store is over 100 years old and is still open for business.

The Hilton Beach jail is unusual in that it never actually housed an inmate. The small building, barely measuring 20' by 20', in fact housed the Hilton Beach Library for several years in the 1920s.  The library is now housed in another historical building on Marks Street.

Demographics

Tourism 

Hilton Beach has been a popular tourist destination since the early 1900s. Several families from Michigan, Ohio, California, Ontario, Washington, Massachusetts and Florida have been spending their summers in and around Hilton Beach since the 1910s.

The MS Norgoma, a package freighter and passenger ferry, called on Hilton Beach on Wednesdays until 1963.

Today, the village attracts visitors primarily from Sault Ste. Marie and southern Ontario, as well as Michigan.

The village's location on Lake Huron makes it a very popular boating destination.  The Hilton Beach Marina has over 180 slips (approximately one for every resident in the town) and is very popular in the summer. The excellent sailing in the St. Joseph Channel is the main attraction for many seasonal residents and tourists. The marina operates from May through to October.

The Hilton Beach Tourist Park, a tent and trailer park, was built in the 1950s. The Park welcomes back dozens of seasonal residents every summer and is a community unto itself during peak season.

Government 
The mayor of the village is Robert Hope, and its councillors are John Wells, Julie C. Moore, John Davison and Shirley Bailey Meeks. The village clerk is Peggy Cramp.

References

External links

Municipalities in Algoma District
Populated places on Lake Huron in Canada
Single-tier municipalities in Ontario
St. Joseph Island (Ontario)
Villages in Ontario